The Volvo effect is a term used in critiquing standardized testing that was created by Peter Sacks in his 2001 book Standardized Minds. The term has been picked up by other sociologists, and counting Volvos has even been facetiously proposed as an alternative method to the spending millions of dollars on standardized testing.

The original text in which the Volvo effect was advanced:

References

External links

Standardized tests